Ur-Nungal of Uruk was the sixth Sumerian ruler in the First Dynasty of Uruk (ca. 26th century BC), according to the Sumerian King List, which also claims he ruled 30 years. Both the Sumerian King List and the Tummal Chronicle state he was the son of Gilgamesh, but only the Sumerian King List records he was the father of Udul-kalama.

References 

|-

Sumerian kings
26th-century BC Sumerian kings
Kings of Uruk